The 2016–17 Indiana Hoosiers women's basketball team represented Indiana University Bloomington during the 2016–17 NCAA Division I women's basketball season. The Hoosiers were led by third year head coach and 2015–2016 Big Ten Coach of the Year Teri Moren, played their home games at Simon Skjodt Assembly Hall and were members of the Big Ten Conference. They finished the season of 23–11, 10–6 in Big Ten play to finish in a tie for fourth place. They lost in the quarterfinals of the Big Ten women's tournament to their in-state rival Purdue. They were invited to the Women's National Invitation Tournament where they defeated Ball State, Saint Louis and SMU in the first, second and third round before losing to Villanova in the quarterfinals.

Preseason
In the 2015–2016 season, the Hoosiers finished 21–12, 12–6 in Big Ten play to finish in fourth place. 2015–2016 was one of the most successful seasons in franchise history. The Hoosiers were ranked in the AP preseason poll at #23, their first time ever being ranked in the preseason.

Roster

Schedule

|-
!colspan=9 style="background:#7D110C; color:white;"| Exhibition

|-
!colspan=9 style="background:#7D110C; color:white;"| Non-conference regular season

|-
!colspan=9 style="background:#7D110C; color:white;"| Big Ten regular Season

|-
!colspan=9 style="background:#7D110C; color:white;"| Big Ten Women's Tournament

|-
!colspan=9 style="background:#7D110C; color:white;"| Women's National Invitation Tournament

Rankings

See also
2016–17 Indiana Hoosiers men's basketball team

References

Indiana Hoosiers women's basketball seasons
Indiana
Indiana Hoosiers
Indiana Hoosiers
2017 Women's National Invitation Tournament participants